Challes is the name or part of the name of several communes in France:
 Challes, Sarthe, in the Sarthe department
 Challes-la-Montagne (formerly Challes), in the Ain department
 Challes-les-Eaux, in the Savoie department